The 2022 United States House of Representatives elections in New Jersey were held on November 8, 2022, to elect the 12 U.S. representatives from the state of New Jersey, one from each of the state's 12 congressional districts.

Overview 
{|class="wikitable plainrowheaders sortable" style="font-size:100%; text-align:right;"
! scope=col rowspan=3|District
! scope=col colspan=2|Democratic
! scope=col colspan=2|Republican
! scope=col colspan=2|Others
! scope=col colspan=2|Total
! scope=col rowspan=3|Result
|-
! scope=col colspan=2 style="background:"|  !! scope=col colspan=2 style="background:"| !! scope=col colspan=2| !! scope=col colspan=2|
|-
! scope=col data-sort-type="number"|Votes !! scope=col data-sort-type="number"|% !! scope=col data-sort-type="number"|Votes !! scope=col data-sort-type="number"|% !! scope=col data-sort-type="number"|Votes !! scope=col data-sort-type="number"|% !! scope=col data-sort-type="number"|Votes !! scope=col data-sort-type="number"|%
|- 
| align=left| || 139,559 || 62.34% || 78,794 || 35.19% || 5,531 || 2.47% || 223,884 || 100.0% ||  align=left|Democratic hold
|- 
| align=left| || 94,522 || 39.97% || 139,217 || 58.87% || 2,745 || 1.16% || 236,484 || 100.0% ||  align=left|Republican hold
|- 
| align=left| || 150,498 || 55.46% || 118,415 || 43.64% || 2,463 || 0.91% || 271,376 || 100.0% ||  align=left|Democratic hold
|- 
| align=left| || 81,233 || 31.37% || 173,288 || 66.92% || 4,441 || 1.71% || 258,962 || 100.0% ||  align=left|Republican hold
|- 
| align=left| || 145,559 || 54.73% || 117,873 || 44.32% || 2,511 || 0.94% || 265,943 || 100.0% ||  align=left|Democratic hold
|- 
| align=left| || 106,238 || 57.45% || 75,839 || 41.01% || 2,842 || 1.54% || 184,919 || 100.0% ||  align=left|Democratic hold
|- 
| align=left| || 150,701 || 48.60%|| 159,392 || 51.40% || 0 || 0.00% || 310,093 || 100.0% ||  align=left|Republican gain|- 
| align=left| || 78,382 || 73.62% || 24,957 || 23.44% || 3,134 || 2.94% || 106,473 || 100.0% ||  align=left|Democratic hold
|- 
| align=left| || 82,457 || 54.98% || 65,365 || 43.58% || 2,162 || 1.44% || 149,984 || 100.0% ||  align=left|Democratic hold
|- 
| align=left| || 100,710 || 77.64% || 25,993 || 20.04% || 3,004 || 2.32% || 129,707 || 100.0% ||  align=left|Democratic hold
|- 
| align=left| || 161,436 || 58.99% || 109,952 || 40.18% || 2,276|| 0.83% || 273,664 || 100.0% ||  align=left|Democratic hold
|- 
| align=left| || 125,127 || 63.12% || 71,175 || 35.91% || 1,925 || 0.97% || 198,227 || 100.0% ||  align=left|Democratic hold
|- class="sortbottom" style="font-weight:bold"
| align=left|Total || 1,416,422 || 54.27% || 1,160,260 || 44.46% || 33,034 || 1.27% || 2,609,716 || 100.0% || 
|}

District 1

Democrat Donald Norcross, who has represented the district since 2014, was re-elected with 62.5% of the vote in 2020.

Democratic primary
Candidates
Nominee
Donald Norcross, incumbent U.S. Representative
Eliminated in primary
Mario DeSantis, public school teacher

Endorsements

Republican primary
Candidates
Nominee
Claire Gustafson, businesswoman, former Collingswood school board member, and nominee for New Jersey's 1st congressional district in 2020
Eliminated in primary
Damon Galdo, union carpenter

Withdrawn
Nicholas Magner, gun rights activist

Endorsements

 General election 
 Predictions 

Polling

 Results 

District 2

Republican Jeff Van Drew, who has represented the district since 2019, was re-elected with 51.9% of the vote in 2020.

Republican primary
Candidates
Nominee
Jeff Van Drew, incumbent U.S. Representative
Eliminated in primary
John Barker, U.S. Army Veteran (previously filed to run in New Jersey's 3rd congressional district)
Sean Pignatelli
Withdrawn
Scott Hitchner, Jr., U.S. Air Force Veteran (Withdrew to run for Salem County Commissioner)

Endorsements

Democratic primary
Candidates
Nominee
Tim Alexander, former County Detective and civil rights attorney
Eliminated in primary
Carolyn Rush, engineer

Withdrawn
Hector Tavarez, retired Egg Harbor Township police captain and school board member (endorsed Alexander)
Curtis Green, Reverend

Declined
Amy Kennedy, mental health advocate, wife of former U.S. Representative Patrick J. Kennedy, and nominee for this seat in 2020 (endorsed Alexander)

Endorsements

 General election 
 Predictions 

Polling

Jeff Van Drew vs. generic Democrat

 Results 

District 3

Democrat Andy Kim, who has represented the district since 2019, was re-elected with 53.2% of the vote in 2020.

Democratic primary
Candidates
Nominee
Andy Kim, incumbent U.S. Representative.
Eliminated in primary
Reuven Hendler, small business owner

Endorsements

Republican primary
Candidates
Nominee
Robert Healey Jr., businessman
Eliminated in primary
Nicholas Ferrara, realtor
Ian Smith, Atilis Gym owner

Withdrawn
John Barker, U.S. Army Veteran (running in New Jersey's 2nd congressional district)
Tricia Flanagan, healthcare policy expert, biotech consultant, and candidate for U.S. Senate in 2020 (running in New Jersey's 4th congressional district)
Shawn Hyland, evangelist and former director of the Family Policy Alliance of New Jersey (filed to run in New Jersey's 4th congressional district, then withdrew)
Will Monk, Mount Holly school board member

Declined
Chris Smith, incumbent U.S. Representative (running in New Jersey's 4th congressional district)

Endorsements

 General election 
 Predictions 

Polling

 Results 

District 4

Republican Chris Smith, who has represented the district since 1981, was re-elected with 59.9% of the vote in 2020.

Republican primary
Candidates
Nominee
Chris Smith, incumbent U.S. Representative
Eliminated in primary
Mike Crispi, conservative TV commentator for Right Side Broadcasting Network
Steve Gray, former FBI special agent
Withdrawn
Mike Blasi, veteran, former corrections officer and realtor (still on the ballot)
David Burg, former head of litigation for NBCUniversal
Daniel Francisco, Englishtown councilmember (running for Monmouth County Commissioner, endorsed Crispi)
Shawn Hyland, evangelist and former director of the Family Policy Alliance of New Jersey (previously filed to run in New Jersey's 3rd congressional district, endorsed Smith)

Disqualified
Tricia Flanagan, biotech consultant, and candidate for U.S. Senate in 2020 (previously filed to run in New Jersey's 3rd congressional district)

Endorsements

Democratic primary
Candidates
Nominee
 Matthew Jenkins, small business owner

Declined
 Abigail Spanberger, incumbent U.S. Representative from Virginia's 7th congressional district (2019–present) (running for re-election)

 General election 
 Predictions 

 Results 

District 5

Democrat Josh Gottheimer, who has represented the district since 2017, was re-elected with 53.2% of the vote in 2020.

Democratic primary
Candidates
Nominee
Josh Gottheimer, incumbent U.S. Representative
Endorsements

Republican primary
Candidates
Nominee
Frank Pallotta, former investment banker and nominee for New Jersey's 5th congressional district in 2020

Eliminated in primary
Nick DeGregorio, veteran
Sab Skenderi

Withdrawn
Nicholas D'Agostino, president of the Sussex-Wantage Regional Board of Education and motivational speaker (running for Sussex County Commissioner)
John Flora, mayor of Fredon (2018–present) (running in New Jersey's 7th congressional district)
Fred Schneiderman, businessman (still on the ballot)

Endorsements

 General election 
 Predictions 

Endorsements

 Results 

District 6

Democrat Frank Pallone, who has represented the district since 1993, was re-elected with 61.2% of the vote in 2020.

Democratic primary
Candidates
Nominee
Frank Pallone, incumbent U.S. Representative

 Endorsements 

Republican primary
Candidates
Nominee
Sue Kiley, Monmouth County Commissioner
Eliminated in primary
Rik Mehta, pharmaceutical executive, attorney, and nominee for U.S. Senate in 2020 (previously filed to run in New Jersey's 7th congressional district)
Tom Toomey, businessman (previously filed to run in New Jersey's 11th congressional district)Withdrawn' Gregg Mele, Libertarian nominee for Governor in 2021

Endorsements

 General election 
 Predictions 

 Results 

District 7

Democrat Tom Malinowski, who has represented the district since 2019, was re-elected with 50.6% of the vote in 2020. Malinowski is running for re-election.

The boundaries of the district will be determined during the 2020 redistricting cycle.

Democratic primary
Candidates
Nominee
Tom Malinowski, incumbent U.S. Representative
Eliminated in primary
Roger Bacon

Endorsements

Republican primary
Candidates
Nominee
Thomas Kean Jr., minority leader of the New Jersey Senate and nominee for New Jersey's 7th congressional district in 2020
Eliminated in primary
Kevin Dorlon, public works contractor
John Flora, mayor of Fredon (2018–present) (previously filed to run in New Jersey's 5th congressional district)John Henry Isemann, businessman
Erik Peterson, New Jersey Assemblymember from the 23rd district (2009–present), member of the Hunterdon County Board of Chosen Freeholders (2006–2009)
Phil Rizzo, pastor and candidate for Governor in 2021 (previously filed to run in New Jersey's 11th congressional district)Sterling Irwin Schwab, U.S. Navy Veteran

Withdrawn
Rik Mehta, pharmaceutical executive, attorney, and nominee for U.S. Senate in 2020 (running in New Jersey's 6th congressional district)Robert Trugman, salon owner

Endorsements

 General election 
Veronica Fernandez was running for this seat as an independent, but later dropped out, citing no path to victory.

On June 7, it was announced that the newly formed Moderate Party would seek to nominate Malinowski as their candidate via electoral fusion, although fusion voting is currently banned in New Jersey. The next day, the Secretary of State Tahesha Way blocked the nomination, but the Moderate Party filed a lawsuit to challenge this, however, a ruling isn't expected until summer of 2023 preventing them from being on the ballot.

 Predictions 

Polling

Generic Democrat vs. generic Republican

 Results 

District 8

Democrat Albio Sires, who has represented the district since 2006, was re-elected with 74.0% of the vote in 2020. In December 2021, Sires announced he would not seek re-election.

Democratic primary
Candidates
Nominee
Robert Menendez, Commissioner of the Port Authority of New York and New Jersey and son of U.S. Senator Bob Menendez

Eliminated in primary
David Ocampo Grajales, progressive activist and healthcare startup director
Ane Roseborough-Eberhard, teacher

Disqualified
Brian Varela, former aide to Governor Chris Christie

Withdrawn
Ricardo Rojas, co-founder of the Progressive Democrats of New Jersey

Declined
Ravinder Bhalla, Mayor of Hoboken (2018–present), former member of the Hoboken City Council At-Large (2009–2017) (endorsed Menendez)Nicholas Chiaravalloti, former Majority Whip of the New Jersey General Assembly (2020–2022), former New Jersey State Assemblymember from the 31st district (2016–2022) (endorsed Menendez)Michael Melham, mayor of Belleville (2019–present) (Independent)Raj Mukherji, former Majority Whip of the New Jersey General Assembly (2018–2019), New Jersey State Assemblymember from the 33rd district (2014–present), former Deputy Mayor of Jersey City (2012–2013), Commissioner & Chairman of the Jersey City Housing Authority (2008–present) (endorsed Menendez)Hector Oseguera, lawyer and candidate for this district in 2020
Teresa Ruiz, New Jersey State Senator from the 29th district (2008–present)
Albio Sires, incumbent U.S. Representative
James Solomon, Jersey City councilman
Brian Stack, New Jersey State Senator from the 33rd district (2008–present), former New Jersey State Assemblymember from the 33rd district (2004–2008), Mayor of Union City (2000–present) (endorsed Menendez)Endorsements

Debates and forums

Republican primary
Candidates
Nominee
Marcos Arroyo, housing inspector

Withdrawn
 Ana Isabel Rivera, plumber's apprentice (previously filed to run in New Jersey's 10th congressional district)Declined
Michael Melham, mayor of Belleville (2019–present) (Independent)David Winkler, perennial candidate

Independent and Third-Party Candidates
Candidates
Joanne Kuniansky, gubernatorial candidate for Socialist Workers Party

Declined
Michael Melham, mayor of Belleville (2019–present)

 General election 
 Predictions 

 Results 

District 9

Democrat Bill Pascrell, who has represented the district since 1997, was re-elected with 65.8% of the vote in 2020.

Democratic primary
Candidates
Nominee
Bill Pascrell, incumbent U.S. Representative

Endorsements

Republican primary
Candidates
Nominee
Billy Prempeh, U.S. Air Force veteran and nominee for New Jersey's 9th congressional district in 2020

Endorsements

 General election 
Lea Sherman is running for this seat with the Socialist Workers Party.
 Predictions 

 Results 

District 10

Democrat Donald Payne Jr., who has represented the district since 2012, was re-elected with 83.3% of the vote in 2020. Payne is running for re-election.

Democratic primary
Candidates
Nominee
Donald Payne Jr., incumbent U.S. Representative
Eliminated in primary
Akil Khalfani, sociology professor
Imani Oakley, activist
Endorsements

Republican primary
Candidates
Nominee
David Pinckney, teacher and perennial candidate
Eliminated in primary
Garth Stewart

Withdrawn
Ana Isabel-Rivera, plumber's apprentice (running in New Jersey's 8th congressional district) General election 
 Predictions 

 Results 

District 11

Democrat Mikie Sherrill, who has represented the district since 2019, was re-elected with 53.3% of the vote in 2020. Sherrill is running for re-election.

Democratic primary
Candidates
Nominee
Mikie Sherrill, incumbent U.S. Representative

Endorsements

Republican primary
Candidates
Nominee
Paul DeGroot, Passaic County assistant prosecutor
Eliminated in primary
Toby Anderson, businessman
Alexander Halter
Ruth McAndrew, registered nurse
Tayfun Selen, Morris County commissioner

Withdrawn
Hillery Brotschol, screenwriter and film producer
Larry Casha, former Kinnelon council president
Larry Friscia, attorney (endorsed Casha)Robert Ković, attorney and former Ridgefield Park councilmember (endorsed Selen)Phil Rizzo, pastor and candidate for Governor in 2021 (running in New Jersey's 7th congressional district)Patrick Quinn III, realtor (running in New Jersey's 9th congressional district)Tom Toomey, businessman (running in New Jersey's 6th congressional district)''

Declined
Rosemary Becchi, tax attorney, nonprofit executive, and nominee for this seat in 2020
Anthony Bucco, New Jersey State Senator from the 25th district (2019–present), former New Jersey Assemblymember from the 25th district (2010-2019), former Minority Whip of the New Jersey General Assembly (2016-2017)
Kristin Corrado, member of the New Jersey Senate from the 40th district (2017–present), former Passaic County Clerk (2010-2017)
Heather Darling, Morris County Surrogate
Aura Dunn, New Jersey Assemblymember from the 25th district (2019-2020, 2020–present)

Endorsements

Polling

General election

Predictions

Polling

Mikie Sherrill vs. Rosemary Becchi

Mikie Sherrill vs. Hillery Brotschol

Results

District 12 

Democrat Bonnie Watson Coleman, who has represented the district since 2015, was re-elected with 65.6% of the vote in 2020.

Democratic primary

Candidates

Nominee 
 Bonnie Watson Coleman, incumbent U.S. Representative

Endorsements

Republican primary

Candidates

Nominee 
 Darius Mayfield

Withdrawn 
 Nick Catucci, film maker

Endorsements

General election

Predictions

Results

Notes 

Partisan clients

References

External links 
Official campaign websites for 1st district candidates
Claire Gustafson (R) for Congress
Donald Norcross (D) for Congress

Official campaign websites for 2nd district candidates
Tim Alexander (D) for Congress
Jeff Van Drew (R) for Congress

Official campaign websites for 3rd district candidates
Robert Healey (R) for Congress
Andy Kim (D) for Congress

Official campaign websites for 4th district candidates
Matthew Jenkins (D) for Congress
Chris Smith (R) for Congress

Official campaign websites for 5th district candidates
Josh Gottheimer (D) for Congress
Frank Pallotta (R) for Congress

Official campaign websites for 6th district candidates
Sue Kiley (R) for Congress
Frank Pallone (D) for Congress

Official campaign websites for 7th district candidates
Thomas Kean Jr. (R) for Congres
Tom Malinowski (D) for Congress

Official campaign websites for 8th district candidates
Rob Menendez (D) for Congress

Official campaign websites for 9th district candidates
Bill Pascrell (D) for Congress
Billy Prempeh (R) for Congress

Official campaign websites for 10th district candidates
Donald Payne Jr. (D) for Congress

Official campaign websites for 11th district candidates
Paul DeGroot (R) for Congress
Mikie Sherrill (D) for Congress

Official campaign websites for 12th district candidates
Bonnie Watson Coleman (D) for Congress
Darius Mayfield (R) for Congress

2022
New Jersey
United States House of Representatives